Megalolamna is an extinct genus of lamniform shark that belongs to the family Otodontidae. Its name comes from the similarity of its teeth to those of the extant shark genus Lamna. It is known from the early Miocene Chilcatay Formation of Peru, Oi and O'oshimojo Formations of Japan, and the Jewett Sand Formation of California and Pungo River Formation, North Carolina in the United States, implying a cosmopolitan distribution.

Taxonomy 

It is considered to be the sister genus of Otodus. The study of Megalolamna's taxonomic relationships also demonstrates the possibility that Otodus needs to include the species sometimes assigned to Carcharocles (i.e., the megatoothed lineage, including megalodon) in order to be monophyletic.

References 

Otodontidae
Prehistoric marine animals
Miocene fish of Asia
Fossils of Japan
Miocene fish of North America
Neogene California
Fossils of North Carolina
Prehistoric fish of South America
Miocene animals of South America
Neogene Peru
Fossils of Peru
Fossil taxa described in 2016